Alvin Augustus Lucier Jr. (May 14, 1931 – December 1, 2021) was an American composer of experimental music and sound installations that explore acoustic phenomena and auditory perception. A long-time music professor at Wesleyan University in Middletown, Connecticut, Lucier was a member of the influential Sonic Arts Union, which included Robert Ashley, David Behrman, and Gordon Mumma. Much of his work is influenced by science and explores the physical properties of sound itself: resonance of spaces, phase interference between closely tuned pitches, and the transmission of sound through physical media.

Early life 

Lucier was born in Nashua, New Hampshire, the son of Kathryn E. Lemery, a pianist, and Alvin Augustus Lucier, a lawyer who was Mayor of Nashua. He was educated in Nashua public and parochial schools and the Portsmouth Abbey School, Yale University and Brandeis University. In 1958 and 1959, Lucier studied with Lukas Foss and Aaron Copland at the Tanglewood Center. In 1960, Lucier left for Rome on a Fulbright grant, where he befriended American expatriate composer Frederic Rzewski and witnessed performances by John Cage, Merce Cunningham, and  David Tudor that provided compelling alternatives to his classical training. He returned from Rome in 1962 to take up a position at Brandeis as director of the University Chamber Chorus, which presented classical vocal works alongside modern compositions and new commissions.

At a 1963 Chamber Chorus concert at New York's Town Hall, Lucier met Gordon Mumma and Robert Ashley, experimental composers who were also directors of the ONCE Festival, an annual multi-media event in Ann Arbor, Michigan. A year later, Mumma and Ashley invited the Chamber Chorus to the ONCE Festival; and, in 1966, Lucier reciprocated by inviting Mumma, Ashley, and mutual friend David Behrman to Brandeis for a concert of works by the four composers. Based on the success of that concert, Lucier, Mumma, Ashley, and Behrman embarked on a tour of the United States and Europe under the name the Sonic Arts Group (at Ashley's suggestion, the name was later changed to the Sonic Arts Union). More a musical collective than a proper quartet, the Sonic Arts Union presented works by each of its members, sharing equipment and assisting when necessary. Performing and touring together for a decade, the Sonic Arts Union became inactive in 1976.

In 1970, Lucier left Brandeis for Wesleyan University. In 1972, Lucier became a musical director of the Viola Farber Dance Company, a position he held until 1979.

Personal life 
Lucier was married to his first wife, Mary, until their divorce in 1972. He then married Wendy Stokes; they had one daughter and remained together until his death.

Lucier died at his home in Middletown, Connecticut, on December 1, 2021, at age 90, from complications of a fall.

Works 

Though Lucier had composed chamber and orchestral works since 1952, the composer and his critics count his 1965 composition Music for Solo Performer as the proper beginning of his compositional career.

I Am Sitting in a Room
One of Lucier's most important and best-known works is I Am Sitting in a Room (1969), in which Lucier records himself narrating a text, and then plays the recording back into the room, re-recording it. The new recording is then played back and re-recorded, and this process is repeated. Since every enclosed area has a characteristic resonance (e.g., between a large hall and a small room), the effect is that certain frequencies are gradually emphasized as they resonate in the room, until eventually the words become unintelligible, replaced by the pure resonant harmonies and tones of the room itself. The recited text describes this process in action. It begins, “I am sitting in a room, different from the one you are in now. I am recording the sound of my speaking voice…”, and concludes with “I regard this activity not so much as a demonstration of a physical fact, but more as a way to smooth out any irregularities my speech might have,” referring to his own stuttering.

Other key pieces 
Other key pieces include North American Time Capsule (1966), which employed a prototype vocoder to isolate and manipulate elements of speech;  Music On A Long Thin Wire (1977), in which a piano wire is strung across a room and activated by an amplified oscillator and magnets on either end, producing changing overtones and sounds; Crossings (1982), in which tones play across a steadily rising sine wave producing interference beats; Still and Moving Lines of Silence in Families of Hyperbolas (1973–74), in which the interference tones between sine waves create "troughs" and "valleys" of sound and silence; and Clocker (1978), which uses biofeedback and reverberation.

Students

Awards

Lucier was awarded an Honorary Doctorate of Arts from Plymouth University in 2007.

Discography

 Orchestra Works, New World Records CD 80755-2, 2013 (contains "Diamonds for 1, 2, or 3 Orchestras," "Slices," "Exploration of the House")
 Almost New York, Pogus Productions CD P21057-2, 2011 (contains "Twonings," "Almost New York," "Broken Line," "Coda Variations")
 "Silver Streetcar for the Orchestra", Nick Hennies, on Psalms Roeba, CD #8, 2010
 Still and Moving Lines of Silence in Families of Hyperbolas, Nick Hennies, Quiet Design CD Alas011, 2010
 Still and Moving Lines of Silence in Families of Hyperbolas, 1-12, Lovely Music, Ltd. CD 1015, 2004
 Navigations for Strings; Small Waves, Mode Records, CD 124, 2003
 Still Lives, Lovely Music, Ltd. CD 5012, 2001 (contains "Music for Piano with Slow Sweep Pure Wave Oscillators," "On the carpet of leaves illuminated by the moon," "Still Lives")
 "Music On A Long Thin Wire" [excerpt] on OHM: The Early Gurus of Electronic Music, 2000. 3CD.
 Theme, Lovely Music, Ltd. CD 5011, 1999 (contains "Music for Piano with Magnetic Strings," "Theme ," " Music for Gamelan Instruments, Microphones, Amplifiers and Loudspeakers")
 Panorama, Lovely Music, Ltd. CD 1012, 1997 (contains "Wind Shadows," "Music for Piano with One or More Snare Drums," "Music for Piano with Amplified Sonorous Vessels," "Panorama ")
 Fragments for Strings, Arditti String Quartet, Disques Montaigne, 1996
 Clocker, Lovely Music, Ltd. CD 1019, 1994
 "Self Portrait", on Upper Air Observation, Barbara Held, flute, Lovely Music, Ltd. CD 3031, 1992
 "Nothing is Real" on Hyper Beatles 2, Eastworld, 1991
 Crossings, Lovely Music, Ltd. CD 1018, 1990 (contains "In Memoriam Jon Higgins," "Septet for Three Winds, Four Strings, and Pure Wave Oscillator," "Crossings")
 "Music for Alpha Waves, Assorted Percussion, and Automated Coded Relays", on Imaginary Landscapes, Elektra/Nonesuch 79235-2, 1989
 Sferics, Lovely Music, Ltd. LP 1017, 1988
 Still and Moving Lines of Silence in Families of Hyperbolas, 5-8, Lovely Music, Ltd. LP 1016, 1985
 Still and Moving Lines of Silence in Families of Hyperbolas, 1-4, Lovely Music, Ltd. LP 1015, 1983
 Music for Solo Performer, Lovely Music, Ltd. LP 1014, 1982 
 I am Sitting in a Room, Lovely Music, Ltd. LP/CD 1013, 1981/90
 Music On A Long Thin Wire, Lovely Music, Ltd. LP/CD 1011, 1980/92
 Bird and Person Dyning/The Duke of York, Cramps, 1975
 "Vespers", on Electronic Sound, Mainstream MS-5010, 1971
 "I am sitting in a room", on SOURCE Record #3, 1970
 "North American Time Capsule", on Music of Our Time series, CBS Odyssey Records, 1967

Films
1976 - Music With Roots in the Aether: Opera for Television. Tape 3: Alvin Lucier. Produced and directed by Robert Ashley. New York City: Lovely Music.
2012 - NO IDEAS BUT IN THINGS. Produced and directed by Viola Rusche and Hauke Harder.

Notes

Bibliography 
 Cox, Christoph. “The Alien Voice: Alvin Lucier’s North American Time Capsule.” In Mainframe Experimentalism: Early Computing and the Foundations of the Digital Arts. Edited by Hannah Higgins and Douglas Kahn. Berkeley: University of California Press, 2009.
 Lucier, Alvin. “Reflections: Interviews, Scores, Writings 1965–1994,” Köln: Edition MusikTexte, 1995. Third enlarged edition (English only), Köln: Edition MusikTexte, 2021.
 Lucier, Alvin. “Origins of a Form: Acoustic Exploration, Science and Incessancy.” Leonardo Music Journal 8 (December 1998) — “Ghosts and Monsters: Technology and Personality in Contemporary Music,” pp. 5–11.
 Moore, Thomas. “Alvin Lucier in Conversation with Thomas Moore.” 1983.

Further reading
eContact! 14.2 — Biotechnological Performance Practice / Pratiques de performance biotechnologique (July 2012). Montréal: Canadian Electroacoustic Community.
 Zimmerman, Walter, Desert Plants – Conversations with 23 American Musicians, Berlin: Beginner Press in cooperation with Mode Records, 2020 (originally published in 1976 by A.R.C., Vancouver). The 2020 edition includes a cd featuring the original interview recordings with Larry Austin, Robert Ashley, Jim Burton, John Cage, Philip Corner, Morton Feldman, Philip Glass, Joan La Barbara, Garrett List, Alvin Lucier, John McGuire, Charles Morrow, J.B. Floyd (on Conlon Nancarrow), Pauline Oliveros, Charlemagne Palestine, Ben Johnston (on Harry Partch), Steve Reich, David Rosenboom, Frederic Rzewski, Richard Teitelbaum, James Tenney, Christian Wolff, and La Monte Young.

External links 
Alvin Lucier's website (Wesleyan University)
 Alvin Lucier scores published by Material Press
Lovely Music Artist: Alvin Lucier
CDeMUSIC: Alvin Lucier
Volume: Bed of Sound: Alvin Lucier
Alvin Lucier in conversation with Thomas Moore

I am sitting in a room (1969) by Alvin Lucier real-time realization by Christopher Burns (2000) 

 
 
Alvin Lucier papers, 1939-2015 Music Division, The New York Public Library.
 Conversation with Alvin Lucier for Radio Web MACBA, 2016

Listening
Lucier on UBUWeb – includes original 1969 recording of I Am Sitting In A Room.
Music for Piano with One or More Snare Drums (1990) performed by Hildegard Kleeb.
Island (1998)  performed by The Other Minds Ensemble at the Other Minds Music Festival in 1999 at Cowell Theater in San Francisco.
  Nothing Is Real (Strawberry Fields Forever) (1990) performed by Margaret Leng Tan at the Other Minds Music Festival in 1999 at the Cowell Theater in San Francisco.
I Am Sitting in a Room. Recreation in 2005, Internet Archive.
I Am Sitting in a Room (1969). Performance by Trevor Cox from 2014 using the acoustics of the Inchindown oil tanks that hold the world record for the ‘longest echo‛.

Movies
Music with Roots in the Aether (1975) from UbuWeb
NO IDEAS BUT IN THINGS, by Viola Rusche and Hauke Harder

1931 births
2021 deaths
20th-century American composers
20th-century classical composers
21st-century American composers
21st-century classical composers
Accidental deaths from falls
Accidental deaths in Connecticut
American classical composers
American_experimental_musicians
American male classical composers
American sound artists
American writers about music
Brandeis University alumni
Experimental composers
People from Middletown, Connecticut
People from Nashua, New Hampshire
Portsmouth Abbey School alumni
Pupils of Aaron Copland
Pupils of Arthur Berger
Pupils of Lukas Foss
Pupils of Quincy Porter
Wesleyan University faculty
Yale University alumni